Sheykhan-e Davud Khuni (also Romanized as Sheykhān-e Dāvūd Khūnī; also known as Sheykhān-e ‘Olyā and Sheykhān-e Dāvūd Khūnī-ye ‘Olyā) is a village in Zaz-e Sharqi Rural District, Zaz va Mahru District, Aligudarz County, Lorestan Province, Iran. At the 2006 census, its population was 379, in 65 families.

References 

Towns and villages in Aligudarz County